Gheorghe Moldoveanu (born 15 December 1945) is a Romanian rower. He competed in the men's coxed pair event at the 1968 Summer Olympics.

References

External links
 

1945 births
Living people
Romanian male rowers
Olympic rowers of Romania
Rowers at the 1968 Summer Olympics
People from Brăila County